Robert Springer may refer to:

 Robert C. Springer (born 1942), American astronaut and test pilot
 Robert D. Springer (born 1933), United States Air Force general